Hebert Brol (born 10 January 1980) is a Guatemalan sports shooter. He competed in the men's double trap event at the 2016 Summer Olympics.

References

External links
 

1980 births
Living people
Guatemalan male sport shooters
Olympic shooters of Guatemala
Shooters at the 2016 Summer Olympics
Place of birth missing (living people)
Pan American Games gold medalists for Guatemala
Shooters at the 2015 Pan American Games
Pan American Games medalists in shooting
Medalists at the 2015 Pan American Games